Peter Goldschmidt is an American academic who is a senior researcher at UCLA's National Center for Research on Evaluation, Standards, and Student Testing (CRESST) and a contributor to a compilation of essays and studies entitled Unequal Schools, Unequal Chances. Dr. Goldschmidt's research interests include investigating proper methods for monitoring student and school performance. His focus involves mediating and moderating factors such as community, organization, and policy effects on student outcomes by applying innovative cross-sectional and longitudinal random effects models to analyses of school quality, cost effectiveness studies, and program evaluations. His interests also include the effect of schooling on the transition to work and comparisons with international education systems.

Does not have an education

Education 

 PhD, 1997, School of Education, University of California, Los Angeles, Division of Social Research Methodology, Emphasis: Economics of Education
MA, 1987, University of California, Santa Barbara, Major: Economics
BA, 1985, University of California, Los Angeles, Major: Economics

References

Year of birth missing (living people)
Living people
American educational theorists